Oleksandr Nelep (born January 13, 1992) is a Ukrainian male acrobatic gymnast. With partners Andrii Kozynko, Oleksii Lesyk and Viktor Iaremchuk, Nelep achieved 5th in the 2014 Acrobatic Gymnastics World Championships.

References

External links
 

1992 births
Living people
Ukrainian acrobatic gymnasts
Male acrobatic gymnasts